Darwin's slimehead (Gephyroberyx darwinii), also known as the big roughy, is a species of fish in the slimehead family found widely in the Atlantic and Indo-Pacific oceans. Based on broadly overlapping morphological features it sometimes (e.g., by IUCN) includes G. japonicus as a synonym.

References

External links
 
 

Trachichthyidae
Taxa named by James Yate Johnson
Fish described in 1866